Cymatozus is a genus of picture-winged flies in the family Ulidiidae.

Species
 Cymatozus marginatus
 Cymatozus polymorphomyiodes

References

Ulidiidae
Tephritoidea genera